The 1963 Harelbeke–Antwerp–Harelbeke was the sixth edition of the E3 Harelbeke cycle race and was held on 16 March 1963. The race started and finished in Harelbeke. The race was won by Noël Foré.

General classification

Notes

References

1963 in Belgian sport
1963